Matt Nasir is an English multi-instrumental musician, based in London, England. He currently plays keyboards in Frank Turner's band The Sleeping Souls and is a member of the London-based rock band, The Pressure Room. He has also previously played in Andy Yorke's live band and is known as the 'Archivist' for his remixing work. Frank Turner and The Sleeping Souls headlined Wembley Arena in April 2012 and played at the Opening Ceremony of the 2012 Olympic Games in London. Nasir also features as the guitarist in a side-project, Möngöl Hörde, with Frank Turner and Frank's former Million Dead bandmate, Ben Dawson. Nasir plays a baritone guitar in Möngöl Hörde.

Discography

Studio albums
 Poetry of the Deed (2009) - Frank Turner
 Wide of the Mark (2010) - The Pressure Room
 England Keep My Bones (2011) - Frank Turner
 Tape Deck Heart (2013) - Frank Turner
 Möngöl Hörde (2014) - Möngöl Hörde
 Positive Songs for Negative People (2015) - Frank Turner
 The Irish Departure (2017)
 Be More Kind (2018) - Frank Turner

EPs
 iTunes Festival: London 2010 (2010) Frank Turner
 Rock & Roll (2010) Frank Turner

Singles
 "The Road" (2009) Frank Turner
 "Poetry of the Deed" (2009) Frank Turner
 "Isabel"' (2009) Frank Turner
 "Try this at Home" (2010) Frank Turner
 "I Still Believe" (2010) Frank Turner

References

English rock musicians
English multi-instrumentalists
Living people
Year of birth missing (living people)